The 15th Cannes Film Festival was held from 7 to 23 May 1962. The Palme d'Or went to the O Pagador de Promessas by Anselmo Duarte. The festival opened with Les Amants de Teruel, directed by Raymond Rouleau.

During the Cannes Film Festival of 1961, Robert Favre le Bret, Artistic Director of the Cannes Film Festival, with the agreement of the French Union of Film Critics, had decided to establish the International Critics' Week during the next Festival. In 1962, this parallel section of the Festival took place for the first time. Its goal was to showcase first and second works by directors from all over the world, not succumbing to commercial tendencies.

Jury
The following people were appointed as the Jury of the 1962 competition:

Feature films
Tetsurō Furukaki (Japan) (author) Jury President
Henry Deutschmeister (France) Vice President
Sophie Desmarets (France)
Jean Dutourd (France)
Mel Ferrer (USA)
Romain Gary (France)
Jerzy Kawalerowicz (Poland)
Ernst Krüger (West Germany)
Yuli Raizman (Soviet Union)
Mario Soldati (Italy)
François Truffaut (France)
Short films
Charles Ford (France) (author) President
Charles Duvanel (Switzerland)
Derek Prouse (UK)
Georges Rouquier (France)
Andréas Winding (France)

Official selection

In competition - Feature film
The following feature films competed for the Palme d'Or:

Adorable Julia (Julia, Du bist zauberhaft) by Alfred Weidenmann
Advise and Consent by Otto Preminger
All Fall Down by John Frankenheimer
Âmes et rythmes by Abdelaziz Ramdani
And Love Has Vanished (Dvoje) by Aleksandar Petrović
A Bomb Was Stolen (S-a furat o bombă) by Ion Popescu-Gopo
The Bread of Those Early Years (Das Brot der frühen Jahre) by Herbert Vesely
Captive Flock (Pleneno yato) by Ducho Mundrov
Children of the Sun (Les Enfants du soleil) by Jacques Séverac
Cléo from 5 to 7 (Cléo de 5 à 7) by Agnès Varda
Devi by Satyajit Ray
Divorce, Italian Style (Divorzio all'italiana) by Pietro Germi
L'Eclisse by Michelangelo Antonioni
Elektra (Ilektra) by Michael Cacoyannis
The Exterminating Angel (El ángel exterminador) by Luis Buñuel
The Female: Seventy Times Seven (Setenta veces siete) by Leopoldo Torre Nilsson
Foundry Town (Kyupora no aru machi) by Kirio Urayama
Harry and the Butler (Harry og kammertjeneren) by Bent Christensen
The Impossible Goodbye (Dom bez okien) by Stanislaw Jedryka
In the Steps of Buddha by Pragnasoma Hettiarachi
The Innocents by Jack Clayton
Joseph the Dreamer (Ba'al Hahalomot) by Alina Gross and Yoram Gross
Konga Yo by Yves Allégret
Liberté I by Yves Ciampi
Long Day's Journey Into Night by Sidney Lumet
The Lovers of Teruel (Les Amants de Teruel) by Raymond Rouleau
The Magnificent Concubine (Yang Kwei Fei) by Li Han Hsiang
Man in Outer Space (Muž z prvního století) by Oldřich Lipský
Mondo Cane by Gualtiero Jacopetti, Paolo Cavara and Franco Prosperi
O Pagador de Promessas by Anselmo Duarte
Plácido by Luis García Berlanga
The Small Stranger (Al Gharib al Saghir) by Georges Nasser
A Taste of Honey by Tony Richardson
The Trial of Joan of Arc (Procès de Jeanne d'Arc) by Robert Bresson
When the Trees Were Tall (Kogda derevya byli bolshimi) by Lev Kulidzhanov

Films out of competition
The following films were selected to be screened out of competition:
 Boccaccio '70 by Cesare Zavattini, Luchino Visconti, Mario Monicelli and Federico Fellini
 Le Crime ne paie pas by Gérard Oury

Short film competition
The following short films competed for the Short Film Palme d'Or:

 Akheytzi by Lada Boyadjieva
 Anarkali, My Beautiful by Jean-Claude See
 Big City Blues by Charles Huguenot Van Der Linden
 Bolshie nepriyatnosti by Vladimir Brumberg & Zinaida Brumberg
 Certosa di pavia by Carlo Ludovico Ragghianti
 Clovek pod vodou by Jiří Brdečka
 Couro de gato by Joaquim Pedro de Andrade
 Danza Espanola by Juan Gyenes
 Faces by Edward McConnell
 Image Of The Sea by Richard Alan Gray
 An Occurrence at Owl Creek Bridge (La Rivière du Hibou) by Robert Enrico
 Le Hampi by Claude Jutra, Roger Morilliere, Jean Rouch
 Les Dieux du feu by Henri Storck
 Les quatre saisons by Niklaus Gessner
 Ljubav I Film by Ivo Vrbanic
 Oczekiwanie by Witold Giersz & Ludwik Perski
 Pan by Herman van der Horst
 Rodolphe Bresdin by Nelly Kaplan
 Roma momenti in Jazz by Enzo Battaglia
 Saguenay by Chris Chapman
 Szenvedely by Jozsef Nepp
 Tagebuch eines Reporters by Manfred Durniok
 Teeth Is Money by Jean Delire & Eddy Ryssack
 The Australian Landscape Painters by Richard Mason
 The Sound of Speed by Bruce Kessler
 Voronet by Ion Bostan
 Zambesi by Raymond Hancock

Parallel section

International Critics' Week
The following feature films were selected to be screened for the 1st International Critics' Week (1e Semaine de la Critique):

 Adieu Philippine by Jacques Rozier (France)
 Alias Big Shot (Alias Gardelito) by Lautaro Murúa (Argentina)
 Bad Boys (Furyō shōnen) by Susumu Hani (Japan)
 The Living Camera: Mooney vs. Fowle by Claude Fournier, Richard Leacock, James Lipscomb, Abbot Mills, D. A. Pennebaker, William Ray (United States)
 Les Inconnus de la terre by Mario Ruspoli (France)
 I nuovi angeli by Ugo Gregoretti (Italy)
 Les Oliviers de la justice by James Blue (France)
 Strangers in the City by Rick Carrier (United States)
 All Souls' Day (Zaduszki) by Tadeusz Konwicki (Poland)
 Tres veces Ana by David José Kohon (Argentina)

Awards

Official awards
The following films and people received the 1962 Official selection awards:
Palme d'Or: O Pagador de Promessas by Anselmo Duarte
Jury Special Prize:
L'Eclisse by Michelangelo Antonioni
The Trial of Joan of Arc (Procès de Jeanne d'Arc) by Robert Bresson
Best Actress:
Katharine Hepburn for Long Day's Journey Into Night
Rita Tushingham for A Taste of Honey
Best Actor:
Dean Stockwell, Jason Robards and Ralph Richardson for Long Day's Journey Into Night
Murray Melvin for A Taste of Honey
Best Cinematic Transposition: Elektra (Ilektra) by Michael Cacoyannis
Best Comedy: Divorce, Italian Style (Divorzio all'italiana) by Pietro Germi
Short films
Short Film Palme d'Or: An Occurrence at Owl Creek Bridge (La Rivière du Hibou) by Robert Enrico
 Prix spécial du Jury: Oczekiwanie by Witold Giersz & Ludwik Perski
 Short film Technical Prize:
 Les Dieux du feu by Henri Storck
 Oczekiwanie by Witold Giersz & Ludwik Perski
 Pan by Herman van der Horst

Independent awards
FIPRESCI
 FIPRESCI Prize: The Exterminating Angel (El ángel exterminador) by Luis Buñuel
Commission Supérieure Technique
Technical Grand Prize:
The Lovers of Teruel (Les Amants de Teruel) by Raymond Rouleau
Elektra (Ilektra) by Michael Cacoyannis
The Magnificent Concubine (Yang Kwei Fei) by Li Han Hsiang
OCIC Award
 The Trial of Joan of Arc (Procès de Jeanne d'Arc) by Robert Bresson

References

Media

British Pathé: Cannes Film Festival 1962 footage
British Pathé: Cannes Film Festival 1962 Awards
INA: Opening of the 1962 festival (commentary in French)
INA: Atmosphere at the 1962 Cannes Festival (commentary in French)
INA: List of winners of the 1962 Cannes Festival (commentary in French)

External links 
1962 Cannes Film Festival (web.archive)
Official website Retrospective 1962 
Cannes Film Festival Awards for 1962 at Internet Movie Database

Cannes Film Festival, 1962
Cannes Film Festival, 1962
Cannes Film Festival